Mysore pak  is an Indian sweet prepared in ghee. It originated in the city of Mysore, one of the major cities in the Indian state of Karnataka. It is made of generous amounts of ghee, sugar, gram flour, and often cardamom. The texture of this sweet is similar to a buttery and dense cookie.
It is also popular in the neighboring country Bangladesh and it's known as Monsur there.

History
It is prepared and given at weddings and other festivals, including baby showers, in southern India. 

The Maharaja of Mysore, Krishna Raja Wadiyar IV, was a food lover and maintained a large kitchen at the Amba Vilas Palace in Mysore.

Kakasura Madappa, the head chef known for preparing sweets, began experimenting, wanting to present the King with something unusual. Adding gram flour, ghee and sugar, he made a soft paaka (or mixture). Madappa was called in and asked for its name. He said the first thing that came to his mind - 'Mysore Pak'. The Maharaja loved the sweet so much that he asked Madappa to open a sweet shop outside the premises of the palace.

Paaka or extreme sweet refers to the sticky sugar syrup obtained by simmering sugar with an equal amount of water; specifically for Mysore pak, the simple syrup heated to the softball stage. The syrup is used as the primary sweetening agent in various Indian sweet dishes like Jalebi, Gulab Jamun, Badam puri, Mysore pak and others. The syrup is given taste with spice essences like cardamom, rose, honey etc. Paaka syrup preparation is a skilled art mastered by few cooks, some of whom keep their methods secret.

The recipe improved through the years. However, the original sweet made with the original recipe is still available at the famous "Guru Sweets" stores in Devaraja Market, run by Kumar and Shivanand, great-grandsons of Madappa.

Ingredients
Mysore Pak is made from Gram flour (Besan), Ghee, Sugar and Water. It is commonly eaten in Southern India. Other ingredients that may or may not be used are Baking soda and Cardamom.

Attributes
 Shape:  Mysore pak is cut into cubes or cuboids.
 Taste:  Mysore pak is a very sweet dish.
 Texture:  Hard and porous when made with less ghee, soft and dense when made with generous amount of ghee. Moisture from the sugar syrup escapes as steam through the greased gram-flour rendering Mysore pak porous. Excess ghee, if any, may fill in such pores rendering it dense.
 Colour:  Yellow to light brown due to gram flour (roasted).
 Shelf life:  Very little water is used in the preparation, so it can stay fresh in a cool and dry place, but it should be consumed within one month only.

See also
Dharwad pedha
Maddur vada
Mangalore bajji

References

External links

https://www.indianmirror.com/culture/indian-specialties/mysorepak.html

Indian desserts
Karnataka cuisine
Culture of Mysore
Indian confectionery
Geographical indications in Karnataka